The Katwe craters or Katwe-Kikorongo explosion craters are a group of volcanic craters within Queen Elizabeth National Park in Toro, Uganda. The unusual formations were formed individually by a series of violent volcanic explosions over the last 1 million years. These maar craters are a result of magma coming in contact with groundwater driving large steam explosions. The explosive events created large, low lying craters with few other signs of volcanic activity.

Many of the craters have now developed into saltwater lakes or lush grasslands.

Overview 
The first written report of Lake Katwe was penned by Speke, who heard second-hand about a legendarily wealthy source of salt close to the base of the Mountains of the Moon. By that time, the lake had been mined for at least 400 years, and with salt being regarded as more valuable than precious metal in pre colonial Uganda, control of this prized possession regularly shifted between the region's different kingdoms. Indeed when Speke visited Uganda in 1882, Lake Katwe had for some years been part of Toro, but in the late 1870s it was recaptured by Omukama Kabalega, a coup that led to the first military confrontation between Bunyoro and a combined British-Toro expedition led by Captain Fredrick Lugard

Lugard arrived at Katwe in 1890 and recorded that: 'Everywhere were piles of salt in heaps covered with grass, some beautifully white and clean'. 

Modern salt making continues and can be seen at Lake Katwe or Kasenyi Crater where local residents maintain a systems of salt ponds. The craters can be visited by more adventurous travelers to the national park. Best viewed from Katwe Explosion Craters Track, a rough, single lane dirt track that climbs through the hills and runs along several crater rims.

References

External links 
 

Volcanoes of Uganda